is a former Japanese football player.

Playing career
Takasaki was born in Fukuoka Prefecture on July 11, 1970. After graduating from Nippon Sport Science University, he joined Japan Football League club PJM Futures (later Tosu Futures, Sagan Tosu) in 1993. However he could hardly play in the match until 1996. In 1997, he became a regular goalkeeper and the club was promoted to new league J2 League from 1999. After he played many matches as regular goalkeeper in 4 seasons, he moved to J1 League club JEF United Ichihara in 2001. However he could hardly play in the match behind Ryo Kushino. In 2002, he moved to Kashima Antlers. However he could hardly play in the match behind Japan national team goalkeeper Hitoshi Sogahata. In 2004, he moved to Oita Trinita. He battles with Hayato Okanaka for the position and he played many matches in 2004. However he could hardly play in the match behind newcomer Shusaku Nishikawa in 2005. In 2006, he moved to Nagoya Grampus Eight. However he could not play at all in the match and retired end of 2006 season.

Club statistics

References

External links

awx.jp

1970 births
Living people
Nippon Sport Science University alumni
Association football people from Fukuoka Prefecture
Japanese footballers
J1 League players
J2 League players
Japan Football League (1992–1998) players
Sagan Tosu players
JEF United Chiba players
Kashima Antlers players
Oita Trinita players
Nagoya Grampus players
Association football goalkeepers